Wartburgkreis III is an electoral constituency (German: Wahlkreis) represented in the Landtag of Thuringia. It elects one member via first-past-the-post voting. Under the current constituency numbering system, it is designated as constituency 7. It covers the northern part of Wartburgkreis.

Wartburgkreis III was created for the 1994 state election. Since 2014, it has been represented by Marcus Malsch of the Christian Democratic Union (CDU).

Geography
As of the 2019 state election, Wartburgkreis III covers the northern part of Wartburgkreis, specifically the municipalities of Bad Liebenstein, Barchfeld-Immelborn, Berka vor dem Hainich, Bischofroda, Creuzburg, Ebenshausen, Frankenroda, Hallungen, Hörselberg-Hainich, Krauthausen, Lauterbach, Mihla, Moorgrund, Nazza, Ruhla, Seebach, Treffurt, and Wutha-Farnroda.

Members
The constituency has been held by the Christian Democratic Union since its creation in 1994. Its first representative was Werner Grünert, who served from 1994 to 1999, followed by Gustav Bergemann (1999–2014) and Marcus Malsch (2014–present).

Election results

2019 election

2014 election

2009 election

2004 election

1999 election

1994 election

References

Electoral districts in Thuringia
1994 establishments in Germany
Wartburgkreis
Constituencies established in 1994